Andy Bellin is an American director and screenwriter, whose credits include the 2013 film Lovelace and the 2011 Clive Owen film Trust.  He is the son of Italian-born model Christina Bellin and New York plastic surgeon Dr. Howard Bellin.

References

External links
 

Living people
Year of birth missing (living people)
Writers from New York City
American male screenwriters
American directors
Screenwriters from New York (state)